Palisa is the remnant of a lunar impact crater that is located to the west of the walled plain Ptolemaeus. It lies to the north-northeast of the crater Davy, and is attached to the lava-flooded satellite crater Davy Y by a wide break in the southwest rim. The crater is named after the Austrian astronomer Johann Palisa.

The rim of Palisa is worn and eroded, especially in the western half where there are multiple gaps that join the crater floor to the Mare Nubium to the west. The interior is nearly flat, and marked only by a pair of tiny craterlets in the southwest gap. The larger of this crater pair is designated Palisa P. Additional satellite craterlets D, A, and W lie just outside the northeast rim.

Satellite craters

By convention these features are identified on lunar maps by placing the letter on the side of the crater midpoint that is closest to Palisa.

References

External links

Palisa at The Moon Wiki

Impact craters on the Moon